Mathias Janssens (born 9 March 1998) is a Belgian professional footballer who plays for club RAAL La Louvière as a goalkeeper.

Club career

Early career
Janssens began playing football in 2003 with Tubize. In 2012, he switched to the academy of Belgian First Division A side Mons and then to Gent for one season in 2014.

Waasland-Beveren
In 2015, Janssens signed with Belgian First Division A side Waasland-Beveren. In 2016 he began playing for the reserve team and made his first appearance on first-team bench on 30 April 2016. He left Waasland-Beveren in summer 2018.

La Louvière
On 5 October 2018, Janssens signed with Belgian Second Amateur Division side RAAL La Louvière. On 11 December 2018, he made his debut in a 2–2 draw against URSL Visé.

Valour FC
On 31 January 2019, Janssens signed with Canadian Premier League side Valour FC. On 12 May 2019, he made his professional debut in a 1–0 win over HFX Wanderers FC. In his second game for Valour, he kept another clean sheet in a 1–0 victory over FC Edmonton. During the 2019 Canadian Premier League season, Janssens split the goalkeeping duties at Valour with Tyson Farago. He ended up playing 12 out of 28 league games, as well as one Canadian Championship match.

Return to La Louvière
After one and a half years without club, Janssens returned to RAAL La Louvière, signing with the club in the summer 2021.

Personal life
Janssens' twin brother Christophe is also a footballer and plays for Westerlo in Belgium.

References

External links

Living people
1998 births
Association football goalkeepers
Belgian footballers
Belgian expatriate footballers
Footballers from Brussels
Belgium youth international footballers
A.F.C. Tubize players
R.A.E.C. Mons players
K.A.A. Gent players
S.K. Beveren players
Valour FC players
RAAL La Louvière players
Canadian Premier League players
Expatriate soccer players in Canada
Belgian expatriate sportspeople in Canada